Družstevník Liptovská Štiavnica is a Slovak football team, based in the village of Liptovská Štiavnica. The club was founded in 1932.

References

External links 
Official website 

Druzstevnik Liptovska Stiavnica
Association football clubs established in 1932
1932 establishments in Czechoslovakia